Basit Igtet (born 24 September 1970) is a Zurich-based entrepreneur and Libyan national who has founded several companies in various sectors. In 2011, he worked to support the Libyan revolution through international lobbying and was consequently appointed as a Special Envoy to the Libyan National Transitional Council (NTC) on 4 September 2011.

Career

In 2004, Igtet formed Swiss International Management AG which provides business services to the State of Qatar.

Work with Libya
In 2010 Igtet founded the Independent Libya Foundation (ILF) together with New York-based businessman Adam M. Hock.

In March 2011, he hosted General Abdul Fatah Younis, former Interior Minister of Libya (under the Gaddafi government), turned leader of the rebel armed forces in the EU capital.

On 14 June 2011, he met with the president of Panama, Ricardo Martinelli at the Palace of the Herons (Palacio de las Garzas) to lobby for official recognition of the NTC.

On 4 September 2011, Igtet was appointed as Special Envoy to the Libyan National Transitional Council for humanitarian aid from the area of North America and South America.

On 19 November 2011, Igtet organized an ILF delegation in Benghazi, Libya to present strategies for rebel re-integration.

Philanthropy
He sponsored one show at La Comédie Française at Paris in 2012.

Personal life
He is married to Sara Bronfman, daughter of billionaire Edgar Bronfman, Sr.; they have one daughter.

References

Sources
 

1970 births
Living people
People from Benghazi
Libyan emigrants to Switzerland
Libyan businesspeople
Bronfman family